The women's super-G competition of the Alpine skiing at the 2023 Winter World University Games was scheduled to be held on 13 January 2023 on Whiteface Mountain, due to adverse weather it was postponed to 14 January.

Results
The race was started at 13:00 (UTC–5).

References

Women's Super-G